Enköpings-Näs Church is a medieval church approximately  south of Enköping in Uppsala County, Sweden. It belongs to the Church of Sweden.

History and architecture
The oldest parts of the church are the tower, the northern wall of the nave and parts of the northern wall of the choir. These date from circa 1200, and are all that remains of an earlier, Romanesque church. It was heavily rebuilt in stages from around 1300 to the second half of the 15th century, when the church acquired the present look. The only substantial alteration that has been made since is the addition of the burial chapel of the aristocratic family Gyllenanckar (1623). The spire of the church tower dates from the first half of the 18th century.

References

External links

13th-century churches in Sweden
Churches in Uppsala County
Churches in the Diocese of Uppsala
Churches converted from the Roman Catholic Church to the Church of Sweden